Bevan Brittan is a UK Top-100 law firm that provides legal and advisory services to 1,600 businesses and organisations across a number of markets. While the firm formally became Bevan Brittan in 2004, its roots can be traced back to the early 1800s.

It operates from four offices across the UK, employing more than 500 people. The firm’s revenue exceeded £60 million for the first time in 2021/22, its ninth consecutive year of growth.

It was ranked 70th in The Lawyer UK 200 in 2022, which is based on firm wide revenue, and recognised in The Times Best Law Firms 2023.

Bevan Brittan provides a wide range of legal advice from commercial, corporate and property to employment and litigation. It supports markets including construction, energy & resource management, higher education, financial services, central and local government, housing and health and social care.

The firm has also been appointed to frameworks to support central government departments, local authorities and NHS bodies. It is a supplier on the Crown Commercial Service Central Government Public Sector Legal Service, and other legal panels including EM Law share.

References

Law firms based in London